Preethi Sharma is an Indian television actress who works predominantly in the Tamil and Telugu industries. She rose to fame in Thirumanam as Anitha and in Chithi 2 as Venba.

Career
Sharma has acted in Thirumanam and The Harvest. In 2017 she won the third prize in the Miss Handloom contest. She was a famous TikToker, until it was banned in India in 2020. Preethi studied at Shri Nehru Vidyalaya up to 10th standard. But she discontinued her studies and started modeling.

She rose to fame from the Tamil series Chithi 2 playing the role of Venba, and is now acting in Padmathi Sandhyaragam. She danced in the album song Vaada Raasa with Ken Karunas and Grace Karunas.

Television

Serials

Shows

Movies

References

External links
 

Indian television actresses
Living people
1996 births